The Canton of Les Aix-d'Angillon is a former canton in the Cher département and in the Centre region of France. It was disbanded following the French canton reorganisation which came into effect in March 2015. It consisted of 12 communes, which joined the canton of Saint-Germain-du-Puy in 2015. It had 12,633 inhabitants (2012).

Geography 
A farming area in the arrondissement of Bourges. centred on the town of Les Aix-d'Angillon.

The canton comprised 12 communes:

Les Aix-d'Angillon
Aubinges
Azy
Brécy
Morogues
Parassy
Rians
Saint-Céols
Saint-Germain-du-Puy
Saint-Michel-de-Volangis
Sainte-Solange
Soulangis

Population

See also 
 Arrondissements of the Cher department
 Cantons of the Cher department
 Communes of the Cher department

References

Aix-d'Angillon
2015 disestablishments in France
States and territories disestablished in 2015